Peridrome is a genus of moths in the family Erebidae erected by Francis Walker in 1854.

Species
 Peridrome orbicularis Walker, 1854
 Peridrome subfascia Walker, 1854

References

Aganainae
Moth genera